The Aichi D1A or Navy Type 94/96 Carrier Bomber (Allied reporting name "Susie") was a Japanese carrier-based dive bomber of the 1930s. A single-engine, two-seat biplane based on the Heinkel He 50, the D1A was produced by Aichi for the Imperial Japanese Navy, remaining in service as a trainer at the time of the attack on Pearl Harbor. The D1A was produced in two variants, the D1A1 (Navy Type 94 Carrier Bomber), and the D1A2 (Navy Type 96 Carrier Bomber, sometimes referred to as the D2A).

Design and development
The D1A came out of the Imperial Japanese Navy's need for an advanced carrier-based dive bomber, and in late 1934 the IJN ordered the finalisation of the Aichi AB-9 design which was produced as the early model D1A1. However, the D1A1 was not designed by  aircraft company (later Aichi Kokuki), but by Ernst Heinkel Flugzeugwerke at the request of the Aichi company. The initial version designed by Heinkel was the He 50, a similar model equipped with floats instead of landing gear. The subsequent model, the He 66 was provided to Aichi who immediately began production of it as the D1A1.

The design of the D1A, based on the Heinkel He 66, an export model of the He 50, was designed as a biplane constructed of metal, with a fabric covering, a fixed landing gear and a conventional type tail landing skid. Original models had 365 kW (490 hp) engines and it was not until later models that more powerful 433 kW (580 hp) engines were included in the construction.

Operational history
The D1A was primarily used in the Second Sino-Japanese War and up to the time Japan entered World War II in 1941.  At the beginning of the Pacific War, all of the remaining D1A1s were decommissioned and most of the D1A2s were retired from the front lines and served primarily in training units. The exception was 68 of the D1A2 model that operated as a second-line support until being retired in 1942.

Variants
D1A1 Type 94
Powered by 433 kW (580 hp) Nakajima Kotobuki 2 Kai 1 or Kotobuki 3 radial engines; 162 built.
D1A2 Type 96 (Sometimes referred to as the D2A)
Improved version fitted with spatted wheels and a higher powered Nakajima Hikari 1 engine; 428 built.
AB-11
Proposed development with retractable undercarriage. Not built.

Operators
  Empire of Japan
 Imperial Japanese Navy Air Service
  Manchukuo
 Manchukuo Imperial Navy

Specifications (D1A2)

See also

References

External links

 AirToAirCombat.com: Aichi D1A Susie

D01A
D01A, Aichi
Single-engined tractor aircraft
Biplanes
Carrier-based aircraft
Aircraft first flown in 1934
Germany–Japan relations